Hampton's line is a thin, radiolucent line seen across the neck of a gastric ulcer filled with barium sulphate during a barium meal. It is a sign of mucosal edema.

It is named after Aubrey Otis Hampton.

References

External links 
 Hampton's line image at learningradiology.com

Radiologic signs
Gastroenterology